American Latin pop duo Ha*Ash has embarked on six tours as a headlining artist and two tour as a supporting act. On April 23, 2002, they released their debut single, "Odio Amarte". They recorded their self-titled first album Ha*Ash with the Mexican producer Áureo Baqueiro in 2003.

The band spent 2003 and 2007 on a 300-Concert Tour around Mexico promoting the album. After this, they performed in the Teatro Metropolitan in Mexico City. During 2009, Ha*Ash continued their album promotion throughout America. They also appeared in the Reventour, a series of concerts in several places in Mexico.  In 2011, the duo released a fourth studio album, entitled, A Tiempo. To promote the album, Ha*Ash embarked on a world concert tour during 2011 and 2013. In early 2011, they toured shortly in Mexico, most notably as part of Shakira's The Sun Comes Out World Tour for three of his shows in Mexico.

On September 17, 2015, Ha*Ash were the opening acts on Ricky Martin's One World Tour for some of his shows in the U.S. They started their own Primera Fila Tour in 2015, visiting Argentina, Costa Rica, Chile, Dominican Republic, Ecuador, El Salvador, Guatemala, Mexico, Peru, Spain, Uruguay, USA and Venezuela. In 2017, they issued 30 de Febrero, to promote the album, Ha*Ash embarked on a world concert tour called Gira 100 años contigo in 2018 and 2020. After completing the tour Gira 100 Años Contigo in February 2020, due to the COVID-19 pandemic, Ha*Ash left the stage and did not return until may 2021, where the band performed at 5 shows at outdoor venues in Mexico.

Concert tours

Supporting tours

Others concerts
{| class="wikitable sortable plainrowheaders" style="text-align:center;" width="100%"
!align="left" valign="top" width="120"|Title
! scope="col" width="14%" |Dates
! scope="col" |Associated album(s)
! scope="col" |Place
!Cities
! scope="col" |Shows
! scope="col" width="2%" class="unsortable" |
|-
! rowspan="4" scope="row" |Ha*Ash en vivo
| May 28, 2021  – May 29, 2021
| rowspan="4"|30 de Febrero
| Palco Tecate
|Monterrey, Mexico
|2
|
|-
|July 2, 2021  – July 3, 2021
|Curva 4 – Autódromo Hnos. Rodríguez
|Mexico City, Mexico
|2
|
|-
|July 16, 2021
|Coliseo Centenario 
|Torreón, Mexico
|1
| 
|-
|October 23, 2021
|Audiorama El Trompo
|Tijuana, Mexico
|1
| 
|- class="expand-child"
| colspan="7" style="border-bottom-width:3px; padding:5px;" |
{{hidden|headercss=font-size: 100%; width: 95%;|contentcss=text-align: left; font-size: 100%; width: 95%;|header= Ha*Ash en vivo set list|content=

 "Estés Donde Estés" (Intro)
 "¿De Dónde Sacas Eso?"
 "Amor a Medias"
 "Ojalá"
 "Sé Que Te Vas"
 "Todo No Fue Suficiente"
 "¿Qué Me Faltó?"
 "Destino o Casualidad"
 "Dos Copas de Más"
 "Eso No Va a Suceder"
 "¿Qué Hago Yo?"
 "No Pasa Nada"
 "Te Dejo en Libertad"
 "Ex de Verdad"
 "100 Años"
 "Lo Aprendí de Ti"
 "No Te Quiero Nada"
Encore
"Perdón, Perdón"
"30 de Febrero"
}}
|}

Promotional tours

Charity showcase

Virtual showcase and concerts

Guest act

Notes

References 

Ha*Ash